Mark Knoller is a former correspondent with CBS best known for his reporting on the White House. He has covered every American president since Gerald Ford, and started gathering statistics on the presidents' daily activities in 1996.

Early life 
Knoller is originally from Brooklyn, NY and graduated from New York University.

Career
On May 28, 2020, it was reported that CBS had laid off Knoller. He tweeted that day that he was still on the job and was waiting to see what he would do next. The layoff was greeted by a tremendous outpouring of support for Knoller from all sides of the political divide.

References

External links 

Living people
CBS News people
Year of birth missing (living people)